Grzegorz Kielsa (born 26 May 1979) is a Canada-based Polish professional boxer.

Amateur career
He fought at both the 2000 and 2002 European Boxing Championships but did not gain a medal at either.

Kielsa represented Poland at the 2000 Olympics in Sydney, Australia. He lost to the Kazakhstan's Mukhtarkhan Dildabekov in his first fight, Dildabekov went on to win the silver medal.

At the 2003 World championships in Bangkok he beat China's Zhang Zhilei in the first round but lost to eventual winner Alexander Povetkin in the next round.

Amateur Boxing Highlights
2000 at the Olympic Games in Sydney, Australia at Superheavyweight. Results were:
 Lost to Mukhtarkhan Dildabekov (KAZ) PTS (16-5)
2003 at the World Championships in Bangkok at Superheavyweight. Results were:
 Defeated Zhang Zhilei (China) PTS (22-8)
 Lost to Alexander Povetkin (Russia) PTS (20-9)

Professional career

Debut fight
Kielsa has fought all of his professional bouts in Canada. His first fight as a professional boxer was in March 2006, in Montreal, Quebec, Canada, when he beat American fighter Mike Jones with a first round knockout.

First title fight
Kielsa won his first 6 fights, 3 wins by KO, and in November 2008, he fought for his first title belt against Toronto based Raymond Olubowale at the Casino Rama, Ontario, for the Canadian heavyweight title. Kielsa, won the title on points being clearly ahead on points all scorecards after ten rounds.

Professional boxing record

|-
|align="center" colspan=8|11 Wins (5 knockouts, 6 decisions), 2 Losses (0 knockouts, 2 decisions), 1 No Contest 
|-
| align="center" style="border-style: none none solid solid; background: #e3e3e3"|Result
| align="center" style="border-style: none none solid solid; background: #e3e3e3"|Record
| align="center" style="border-style: none none solid solid; background: #e3e3e3"|Opponent
| align="center" style="border-style: none none solid solid; background: #e3e3e3"|Type
| align="center" style="border-style: none none solid solid; background: #e3e3e3"|Round
| align="center" style="border-style: none none solid solid; background: #e3e3e3"|Date
| align="center" style="border-style: none none solid solid; background: #e3e3e3"|Location
| align="center" style="border-style: none none solid solid; background: #e3e3e3"|Notes
|-align=center
|Loss
|
|align=left| Neven Pajkic
|UD
|10
|30/06/2010
|align=left| Rama, Ontario, Canada
|align=left|
|-
|Loss
|
|align=left| Neven Pajkic
|UD
|10
|27/03/2010
|align=left| Rama, Ontario, Canada
|align=left|
|-
|Win
|
|align=left| Jason Bergman
|UD
|6
|21/11/2009
|align=left| Rama, Ontario, Canada
|align=left|
|-
|Win
|
|align=left| Kevin Montiy
|NC
|2
|04/09/2009
|align=left| Rama, Ontario, Canada
|align=left|
|-
|Win
|
|align=left| Byron Polley
|TKO
|4
|26/06/2009
|align=left| Rama, Ontario, Canada
|align=left|
|-
|Win
|
|align=left| Arthur Cook
|TKO
|8
|20/03/2009
|align=left| Rama, Ontario, Canada
|align=left|
|-
|Win
|
|align=left| Raymond Olubowale
|UD
|10
|21/11/2008
|align=left| Rama, Ontario, Canada
|align=left|
|-
|Win
|
|align=left| Jerry Butler
|UD
|8
|29/08/2008
|align=left| Rama, Ontario, Canada
|align=left|
|-
|Win
|
|align=left| Alvaro Morales
|UD
|4
|20/06/2008
|align=left| Las Vegas, Nevada, U.S.
|align=left|
|-
|Win
|
|align=left| Kenny Lemos
|TKO
|3
|05/04/2008
|align=left| Rama, Ontario, Canada
|align=left|
|-
|Win
|
|align=left| Stephane Tessier
|UD
|6
|28/10/2006
|align=left| Gatineau, Quebec, Canada
|align=left|
|-
|Win
|
|align=left| Mickey Richards
|TKO
|2
|23/06/2006
|align=left| Toronto, Ontario, Canada
|align=left|
|-
|Win
|
|align=left| Stephane Tessier
|UD
|4
|08/04/2006
|align=left| Montreal, Quebec, Canada
|align=left|
|-
|Win
|
|align=left| Mike Jones
|KO
|2
|11/03/2006
|align=left| Montreal, Quebec, Canada
|align=left|
|}

References

External links
 

1979 births
Living people
Heavyweight boxers
Super-heavyweight boxers
Olympic boxers of Poland
Boxers at the 2000 Summer Olympics
Sportspeople from Białystok
Polish male boxers